Galhagoog is a town in the north-central Mudug region of Somalia.

References

report from the UN Somalia Standing Committee

Populated places in Mudug